A music jury is a final performance by a music student for a panel of jurors, usually consisting of faculty of the institution.  Students attend private lessons throughout the year, and they perform at the end of a semester or the year to illustrate progress before the panel.

References

Both cited references no longer exist.

Music education